Evergreen Diplomats was a professional soccer team based in Landover, Maryland. On April 3, 2014 it was announced that the club would compete in the American Soccer League (ASL) in 2014–15.  The Diplomats are owed by United Paradigm Group and the Executive Director is Tony Poarch. The Diplomats 1st head coached was Philip Gordon, a native of Scotland and product of Hibernian F.C. Academy who was replaced by Al Reza.

The club play their home matches at Marvin F. Wilson Stadium, which is part of the Prince George's Sports & Learning Complex. The facility features a FieldTurf surface and eight-lane running track.

Club

Roster

External links 
 Evergreen Diplomats website
 Marvin F. Wilson Stadium

References 

American Soccer League (2014–2017) teams
Soccer clubs in Maryland
2014 establishments in Maryland
Association football clubs established in 2014